The Fiscal Responsibility Act of 2007 was introduced to the United States Congress by Rep. Nathan Deal of  on January 16, 2007.

The bill, which has eight co-sponsors, was referred to the House Administration Committee and the House Oversight and Government Reform Committee. The bill's purpose is to give members of Congress a personal financial incentive to prevent the federal government from running budget deficits. H.R. 500 is endorsed by the American Conservative Union and Downsize DC.

The bill would cut the pay of members of Congress every year the federal government runs a budget deficit. An exception is made for spending that the Director of the Congressional Budget Office determines is directly related to a military conflict lasting over 30 days or in response to a terrorist attack on the United States.

The bill, if passed, would take effect no earlier than the 2008 fiscal year. If the federal government is determined by the Director of the Congressional Budget Office to have run a deficit in 2008, then the pay of members of Congress will be docked in 2009. Any cost-of-living adjustments they might have received will be nullified, and Representatives and Senators will take a 5% cut from their 2008 pay rates. If the federal government runs a deficit the following year, in 2009, then members will receive a 10% cut from their 2008 pay rates, and will continue to receive a 10% cut for each succeeding, consecutive year the federal government runs a deficit. If, following one or more years in which Members' pay is reduced under the Fiscal Responsibility Act, there occurs a fiscal year in which there is no deficit, then salaries for Members shall be restored to what they were before reductions took place, plus any cost-of-living adjustments they would have received.

External links
 Text of H.R. 500, the Fiscal Responsibility Act  from the Library of Congress' Thomas website.

Proposed legislation of the 110th United States Congress